Alberta Christine Williams King (September 13, 1904 – June 30, 1974) was an American civil rights organizer best known as the mother of Martin Luther King Jr., and as the wife of Martin Luther King Sr. She played a significant role in the affairs of the Ebenezer Baptist Church. She was shot and killed in the church by 23-year-old Black Hebrew Israelite Marcus Wayne Chenault six years after the assassination of her eldest son Martin Luther King Jr.

Life and career

Alberta Christine Williams was born on September 13, 1904. Her parents were Reverend Adam Daniel Williams, at the time preacher of the Ebenezer Baptist Church in Atlanta, Georgia, and Jennie Celeste (Parks) Williams. Alberta Williams graduated from high school at the Spelman Seminary, and earned a teaching certificate at the Hampton Normal and Industrial Institute (now Hampton University) in 1924.

Williams met Martin L. King (then known as Michael King), whose sister Woodie was boarding with her parents, shortly before she left for Hampton. After graduating, she announced her engagement to King at the Ebenezer Baptist Church. She taught for a short time before their Thanksgiving Day 1926 wedding, but she had to quit because the local school board prohibited married women from teaching. 

After their wedding the newly married couple moved into an upstairs bedroom at the Williams's family home, which is where all three of their children were subsequently born. The King family lived in the home until King's mother's death from a heart attack in 1941, when Martin Jr. turned 12 years old. In 1980 the home was designated for preservation as part of the Martin Luther King Jr. National Historical Park. The house the family subsequently moved to was located nearby (it has since been torn down).

The King's first child, daughter Willie Christine King, was born on September 11, 1927. Michael King Jr. followed on January 15, 1929, then Alfred Daniel Williams King I, named after his grandfather, on July 30, 1930. About this time, Michael King changed his name to Martin Luther King Sr.

Alberta King worked hard to instill self-respect into her children. In an essay he wrote at Crozer Seminary, Martin Luther King Jr., who was always close to her, wrote that she "was behind the scenes setting forth those motherly cares, the lack of which leaves a missing link in life."

During this period King continued her studies at Morris Brown College, receiving a BA in 1938.

King founded the Ebenezer choir and served as church organist from 1932 to 1972. Her work as organist and as director at Ebenezer is considered to have deeply contributed to the respect her son had for music. She served as choir director for nearly 25 years, leaving for only a brief period in the early 1960s to accompany her son and assist him with his work. She returned to the position in 1963 and continued in the role until "retiring" in 1972.  

In addition to the choir, Alberta would also serve as the organizer and president of the Ebenezer Women's Committee from 1950 to 1962. By the end of this period, Martin Luther King Sr. and Jr. were joint pastors of the church. 

Outside of her work at Ebenezer, King was the organist for the Women’s Auxiliary of the National Baptist Convention from 1950 to 1962. She was also active in the YWCA, the National Association for the Advancement of Colored People (NAACP), and the Women’s International League for Peace and Freedom.

Family tragedies, 1968–1974
Martin Luther King Jr. was assassinated on April 4, 1968, while standing on the balcony of the Lorraine Motel in Memphis. King was in Memphis to lead a march in support of the local sanitation workers' union. He was pronounced dead one hour later. Mrs. King, a source of strength following her son's assassination, faced fresh tragedy the next year when her younger son and last-born child, Alfred Daniel Williams King, who had become the assistant pastor at the Ebenezer Baptist Church, drowned in his pool.

Assassination
Alberta King was shot and killed on June 30, 1974, aged 69, by Marcus Wayne Chenault, a 23-year-old Black man from Ohio who had adopted the theology of the Black Hebrew Israelites. Chenault's mentor, Hananiah Israel of Cincinnati, castigated Black civil rights activists and Black church leaders as being evil and deceptive, but claimed in interviews not to have advocated violence. Chenault did not draw any such distinction, and first decided to assassinate Rev. Jesse Jackson in Chicago, but canceled the plan at the last minute. 

Two weeks later he set out for Atlanta, where he shot Alberta King with two handguns as she sat at the organ of the Ebenezer Baptist Church. Chenault said that he shot King because "all Christians are my enemies," and claimed that he had decided that Black ministers were a menace to Black people. He said his original target had been Martin Luther King Sr., but he had decided to shoot King's wife instead because she was near him. He also killed one of the church's deacons, Edward Boykin, in the attack and wounded retired schoolteacher Jimmie Mitchell in the neck. 

King and Boykin were rushed to the nearby Grady Memorial Hospital. Officials announced King was "barely alive" when she arrived at the hospital. Boykin was pronounced dead on arrival. King died shortly afterward from a gunshot wound to the right of her head.

Alberta King was interred at the South-View Cemetery in Atlanta. Martin Luther King Sr. died of a heart attack on November 11, 1984, and was interred next to her.

Assassin's conviction
Chenault was convicted of first-degree murder and sentenced to death. The sentence was upheld on appeal. He was later resentenced to life in prison, partially as a result of the King family's opposition to the death penalty. On August 3, 1995, he suffered a stroke, and was taken to a hospital. On August 19, he died aged 44 from complications from his stroke.

Notes

References 
 The Papers of Martin Luther King Jr. Volume I: Called to Serve, January 1929-June 1951 (University of California Press, 1992) Introduction
 The Autobiography of Martin Luther King, Jr. (New York: Warner Book, 1998) Chapter 1 edited by Clayborne Carson
 Martin Luther King, Jr., "Autobiography of Religious Development," 22 November 1950
 Daddy King and Me: Memories of the Forgotten Father of the Civil Rights Movement. Continental Shelf Publishing, 2009; Chapter Four, p. 69.

External links
 Stanford University biography of Alberta King
 African American registry article on the death of Alberta King
 
 The King Center biography of Martin Luther King, Jr

1904 births
1974 deaths
African-American Christians
American murder victims
Baptists from Georgia (U.S. state)
People from Atlanta
Spelman College alumni
Hampton University alumni
People murdered in Georgia (U.S. state)
Deaths by firearm in Georgia (U.S. state)
Alberta Williams 
Murdered African-American people
1974 murders in the United States
Burials at South-View Cemetery